An estuary is a semi-enclosed body of water flowing into the sea.

Estuary may also refer to:

 Estuary English, a variety of English spoken in the south east of England
 Estuary, Saskatchewan, a community of Saskatchewan, Canada
 "Estuary", a song by Saccharine Trust from the album Worldbroken

See also